"Excitement" is a song by American rapper Trippie Redd and Canadian singer PartyNextDoor, released as the lead single from the former's third studio album Pegasus (2020). Released on May 15, 2020, the track was released under Trippie Redd's labels 1400 Entertainment and 10K Projects. The track went viral on the popular social media app TikTok.

Background
Trippie first previewed the song with a short video on his Instagram on April 4, 2020, captioning the post: “🎠 @partynextdoor.” Trippie previewed a longer high-quality portion of the track on April 20, confirming its title in the post’s caption.

Music video
The music video premiered on May 15, 2020, and was directed by Aidan Cullen.

Charts

Certifications

References

2020 singles
2020 songs
Trippie Redd songs
PartyNextDoor songs
Songs written by Trippie Redd
Songs written by PartyNextDoor